Saver (세이버) is a manhwa written by Lee Eun-young (이은영). It is a historical fantasy based around an emotionally scarred woman who is transported magically to the Scottish Middle Ages. Serialized in the magazine Issue, the publication has accumulated seventeen volumes since 2002 and is completed. Its English translation under Tokyopop was discontinued after six volumes.

Plot
Lena Ha is a beautiful and tough girl who is the captain of kumdo team. She grew up under the eye of her single mother, who is constantly harassed by the wife of Lena's father. She meets Hyun-Min Kang, the son of the president of a large company in Korea, and the two seem to feel love at first sight. The couple learn that they are half-siblings, and Hyun-Min's mother thinks Lena has motives of revenge for her relationship with Hyun-Min. Thus Hyun-Min's mother sends her thugs to take care of the problem. They murder Lena's mother with Lena's sword and then chase Lena down and attack her until she  falls into a strange body of water. When Lena comes to, she finds herself in an unfamiliar kingdom, with only the sword that ended her mother's life and thoughts of revenge. She is told by a prophet that her only way to return home is to disguise herself as a man and find the rightful king of the land. On her journey to find this man she comes to discover a feeling of responsibility towards the people of this land, and the people of the land discover that they might have found their "Child of Destiny."

Characters

The Five
Lena Ha (aka Ley) is an intelligent, strong, and beautiful Korean girl who was the captain of the kumdo team. She lived with her single adoptive mother, a self-proclaimed 'Herb Fanatic,' whom Lena tried to protect from her father's wife. She despises her father, but also wants his acknowledgment, which she thinks she could only have earned had she been born a boy. Upon her arrival in the Scottish Middle Ages, she hides her sex and calls herself "Ley" and is known as a fearsome warrior. Her actions and words show the charisma of "a born leader", causing many to follow her instinctively. When she meets Maron, she is told she is originally from Scotland, not Korea. A child of Jira, who became a concubine of the King of Aran. Lena had been stolen as a baby by the previous Queen Ariana who had become mentally unstable from the loss of her son to her daughter who later became Queen Eleanor. After Maron told Eleanor that Lena would eventually kill her, she pushed Ariana and Lena into the river. Before Ariana drowned, she sent Lena to present-day Korea where she was adopted by her mother. After the final battle at Sevia, Ariana sends Lena back to Korea where she says her goodbyes to Hyun-Min and then returns to Scotland to stay.

Sean Renock the 3rd is one of Ley's first companions. Sean is a bored prince who, after a fight with his father, leaves his castle and heads toward the city in search of adventure. He finds it in Ley, whose skill in breaking up a bar fight causes Sean to respect Ley's fighting ability. Ley refuses to take Sean under her wing, but cannot shake him from following. Sean is a very pure-hearted and inexperienced boy, and as a result is often the butt of jokes about his ineptitude.

Cid is another of Ley's early companions, who has sworn an oath to avenge the death of his father by the Jager Tribe. He meets Ley soon after Ley escapes the slave trading practices of the Jagers. He teams up with Ley to successfully save the rest of the slaves including Sean. Because of Ley's charisma Cid is convinced that Ley is the Child of the Prophecy, and vows to protect him.

Michael is another companion of Ley's who is quite mysterious. He seems to have an untrustworthy aura around him, and both Cid and Ley are slightly wary of him. It is revealed he is a "toy" of Queen Eleanor who sent to capture the Child of the Prophecy. Instead he falls in love with Ley, and walks the tenuous line between betraying his owner and betraying his love. His name was given to him by the queen for his "angelic beauty".

Sharis is a short-tempered, young girl with excellent archery skills. She attempted to murder the Earl in his sleep, however she was badly injured and barely managed to escape. Sean finds her in the woods and brings her back to Cid. After she recovers, she becomes the last of "the five" to join Ley's group. She despises the Earl as he killed & burned down her entire village in exchange for her sister, Brenna, "the woman he wanted the most", who he keeps captive in his castle.

Royalty
Lucien Wyclef is the rightful king of Tamir who lost his kingdom to the Earl Auye plunging his subjects into tyranny and poverty. At one point he tries to reclaim his kingdom through a marriage alliance with the powerful, but tyrannical Queen Eleanor. He and Ley meet each other in a dream, and he proclaims her his true love and kisses her before a shadow, later discovered to be Queen Eleanor, takes him away. Upon waking, he decides to ignore the dreams of love and continue his political advancement through marriage. He later meets Ley and is confused by the fact that Ley is a "man" though he cannot shake the feelings he has toward Ley. He later discovers that Ley true gender during the gladiator battle that took place the day before he was to be wed to Queen Eleanor.

Arena Wyclef is Lucien's younger sister, and a princess of Tamir. She lost her voice due to the shock of her parents' murder.

Jaime Wyclef is Lucien's younger brother, and a prince of Tamir. He has been missing since the murder of his parents, and is assumed to be dead.

Lucien's parents are the former king and queen of Tamir who were murdered by Earl Auye during a revolt of the top feudal Earls of Tamir when Lucien was still in his early teens. The influence Lucien's father had on him plays a big part in how Lucien acts and makes decisions.

Queen Eleanor is a dark and sadistic woman who is essentially responsible for the breakout of war. She strategically has planned everything from the start, manipulating many people such as the Jager tribe and the Earl. She has disturbing methods of torturing and brands the majority of her prisoners. She is entertained by murder and has killed so many people that the river carries hundreds of corpses. When she was a child, she pushed Ariana and Lena into the river, which resulted in Lena being sent to present-day Korea. During the final battle at Sevia, she is killed by the 'ghost' of Ariana.

Ariana was a member of the Leon tribe until she was raped by the king of Kabul, and was forced to marry him and become queen of Kabul. Four years after she gave birth to Eleanor, she gave birth to a son who Eleanor killed as a baby. Afterward, Ariana went insane. Several years later, the king took her to a party in Aran, and Ariana stole baby Lena from Jira and then returned to Kabul. Shortly afterward, she and the baby were pushed into the river by Eleanor, and Ariana used the last of her power before she died to send Lena to present-day Korea.

Eleanor's father is the former king of Kabul. He got lost in the Leon Tribe's land, and happened upon Ariana. He fell in love with her at first sight, raped her, and forced her to marry him. He loved Eleanor, and doted on her.

Siegfried is the prince of Aran, and Lena's stepbrother. He is very immature and frequently flirts with girls, including Ley and Eleanor. Initially he seems to be on the Queens side, but it is revealed that he was only getting close to her to kill her and take control of Kabul. He openly supports Lucien later on, and helps him escape with the others after the gladiator fight.

Sean Renock the 2nd is Sean's father, and the king of Laud. He is very strict with Sean, but only because he is trying to protect him. He and his wife were put into captivity by his illegitimate son, but were later rescued by Sean. He supports Lucien in the war between Kabul and Tamir.

Kal is Sean's half-brother, and was Laud's captain of defense. He was unsatisfied with his position, and started a rebellion while Sean was missing. With the help of Earl Auye, he became the king of Laud for a short time, until Sean returned and put the real king back into power. He is imprisoned until Sean's father decides what to do with him.

Leon Tribe
Members of the Leon Tribe all have pale hair and eyes, special powers, incredibly long lives, and are very powerful warriors. Their beauty often causes them to be mistaken for fairies. They tend to keep to themselves, content to quietly and peacefully ignore the conflicts of the surrounding countries. They are merciless to those who happen to trespass on their land, especially toward those of the Jager Tribe. Ley manages to convince them to support Lucien in the war between Kabul and Tamir.

Shine is a high-ranking individual in the Leon Tribe, and Ariana's older brother. He leads the armies in battle. He seems to have special feelings for Ley, telling her that he doesn't have a lover because "there was no one like you," and frequently helps and protects her.

The tribe leader is Ariana's father. For a long time he was neutral in the conflict, presumably "keeping an eye on" Eleanor to make sure her Leon powers didn't awaken. Ley convinces him to take action, and he allows the Leon army to aid Lucien.

Gideon is a prophet who saved Lena when she first appeared in his world, he is also the major prophet Kabul. He and his foster daughter, Maria, find and save Lena after she was stabbed. He believes that Lena is the 'Child of the Prophecy', who is meant to save his world. He has Lena disguise herself as a man under the name of "Ley." After the attack on his village which separated him and Lena, he has been traveling with his foster daughter.

Maron is an elderly Leon who was confined to a cave under Eleanor's orders. Her power to only speak the truth was used by Eleanor to hunt people down, including Ariana and Lena, thus burdening her with constant guilt over the murders. She is the one who made the prophecy about Ley, and used to be Ariana's maidservant.

Jager Tribe
The members of the Jager tribe are assassins under the control of Queen Eleanor, and are led by Yuriel. They all bear tattoos somewhere on their bodies. They are the enemies of the Leon Tribe. They eventually turn against Eleanor when she kills the majority of them under the suspicion that they were preparing to betray her.

Yuriel was the chief of the Jager tribe, and Daniel's older brother. He planned to capture the Child of the Prophecy and use that power to become the next ruler. He was cruel and merciless, ordering his troops to kill and destroy entire villages (women and children included). He was killed by Ley during the final battle at Sevia.

Kiel was one of the Jagers who went to Billa to find the Child of the Prophecy. After discovering Ley in Gideon's house, Gideon killed him. He was Ethelle's brother.

Ethelle is one of the Jagers closest to Yuriel. She seems to have a connection with Gideon, and holds a grudge against him for killing her brother, Kiel. She is Kiel's sister.

Joel was one of the Jagers who killed Cid's father. Cid hunted him down and wounded his eye, and shortly afterward he was killed by Leons.

Nicole is a Jager also involved in Cid's father's death, and is running from Cid.

Camiel is a Jager who was in charge of keeping track of Lady Linua. He eventually switches sides, and helps Sharis and Linua escape when they are being held captive by the Earl.

Daniel is Yuriel's younger brother and polar opposite. He is rarely serious, and tends to do things very half-heartedly to irritate Yuriel. He is only shown as being angry when Eleanor kills most of the Jagers after the Earl tried to get them to follow him instead.

Allies
Willem is Lucien's grandfather, and the Earl of Belus. He is often called the Wise One, or the Great One. He is a scholar and considered to be the greatest intellectual of that time. Ley entrusted his katana in Willem's care after they escaped from the Cave of Death, and he gave it to Lucien much later. He knows Ley came from a different world.

Ian is a man who bears a striking resemblance to Hyun-Min. He is the leader of a village of thieves that had joined together after escaping their previously miserable lifestyles. He has no memories of his childhood, therefore his true family and birthplace are unknown. After the village was attacked and destroyed by Yuriel's army, he swore to rebuild it and start again. He promised to help Ley's group if ever needed. He aided Sean in returning Laud to Sean's father's control. He seems to have special feelings for Linua.

Max is the captain of the guards at Glasgow. He was removed from his position by Chris and labeled a rebel because of his loyalty to Lucien. He threatened Ley and his friends to rescue Earl Romero, and was reunited with Lucien soon after. Later on, he discovered Eleanor's plans to use Lucien, but was captured before he could warn anyone. He was imprisoned for a while until he was put into the gladiator ring alongside Ley and Sharis where he was severely wounded protecting Ley.

Nox is one of Lucien's servants, and accompanies Lucien wherever he goes. The two are very good friends. For Lucien's sake, he often tries to bring Lucien and Ley closer to one another.

Romero is the Earl of Glasgow, and Chris' uncle. He was imprisoned and had his eyes gouged out by Yuriel when Chris took over Glasgow. He was later rescued by Ley and his friends under Max's request.

Lady Linua is the illegitimate daughter of Earl Auye, and is used as a tool in the Earl and Eleanor's plans. However, she often runs away with her maid to avoid doing what the Earl wants. She fell in love with Ley when he rescued her from Ian in the Forest of Evil. Later, her focus of affection changes to Ian. She helps Sharis, Ley, and Sean infiltrate Earl Auye's castle to rescue Sharis' sister and allow Lucien to attack the castle, resulting in her father's death.

Enemies
Chris was the ruler of Glasgow with the help of Yuriel. He had a preference for men, and tended to flirt with whoever he liked the looks of. He fled to Cunak after Glasgow was taken from him. He held a grudge against Ley for a facial injury Ley inflicted on him after he killed Edith. He was later killed by Ley during the final battle at Sevia.

Earl Auye is a usurper who was once the minister of the former kingdom of Tamir. His shameless and merciless strategies often cause attacked nations to lose all hope of ever rising again. He holds especial disdain for Lucian Wyclef and vows to take "all he holds dear". In contrast to his cruel nature, he is known for being very beautiful. He is Linua's father, and tries to get her to marry Kal (as well as Sean, before he disappeared) to gain power in Laud. Sharis' older sister, Brenna, is his wife, and they have a son. Auye was killed by Lucien when Tamir's armies attacked his castle in Cunak. (EDIT: Earl Auye was killed by his wife, Sharis' sister, Brenna, with a dagger because he killed her family and village, then kidnapped and raped her. She then voluntarily married him because she did not want to raise her child as a bastard and was waiting for the right time to strike.)

Mark is the younger cousin of Earl Auye, and one of the leaders of the Earl's armies. He is very loyal to the Earl, and follows his orders without hesitation. He is killed by Ley during the battle at Rohim due to an underestimation of the town's people's fighting skills.

Demitri is Mark's younger brother. He is cruel and violent, showing obvious jealousy toward Mark when the Earl puts him in charge of leading the armies. He is often at odds with the Earl, disagreeing with the Earl's reckless battle plans and strategies. After Mark's death, Demitri kills all of the survivors in Rohim, resulting in Ley chasing him down for revenge.

Yan was one of Queen Eleanor's servants. His position and duties were similar to that of Michael's, though he seemed to be of a slightly lower rank. He was very competitive with Michael, and often taunted him when Eleanor chose him over Michael for a task. When he attempted to kill Michael during the final battle at Sevia, Lucien killed him.

People from the Present
Hyun-Min Kang is Lena's half brother, who fell in love with her before he learned of their family connections. He continues to love her after he finds out they share a father and insists that their blood should have nothing to do with their love. After his mother discovered the relationship between Lena and Hyun-Min she attempted to have Lena murdered but in the confusion Hyun-Min was injured and slipped into a coma. He is later shown sitting catatonic in a wheel chair outside a hospital when Lena returns to say goodbye to him.

Lena's mother is a weak woman who found Lena as a baby during an attempt at suicide. She adopted Lena and passed her off as her ex-lover's baby with whom she was still in love with, though he had no feelings for her. She often frustrated Lena because of her pathetic love. She raised Lena like a boy in a futile attempt to gain his recognition. Lena's father's wife despised them both and often harassed them. Eventually, she hired thugs that killed Lena's mother using Lena's own sword. Lena swore to purify the sword with the blood of her mother's killers.

Lena's father is the president of a large company, and Lena's adoptive mother's ex-lover. He has a strong yet cold personality, and it was once said that Lena had inherited this. He puts the reputation of his company before Lena (an illegitimate child) and her mother (of low status). Lena claims it is because they "remind him that he has made mistakes" that he ignores them both. His words towards Lena are harsh, but they often don't match what he truly feels. His cold, cruel attitude towards Lena likely contributed to her distrust of others.

Hyun-Min's mother is the wife of Lena's father, and technically Lena's stepmother. She absolutely despises both Lena and her mother, calling them "cheap and dirty". She sends thugs after Lena who accidentally send Hyun-Min into a coma. After hearing of this, she becomes furious and sends more thugs who kill both Lena's mother and Hee-Soo Kwon.

Hee-Soo Kwon is Lena's roommate. She deeply loves Lena without ulterior motives, which Lena can't understand. Out of jealousy, Hee-Soo informs Hyun-Min's mother of Hyun-Min's relationship with Lena. The situation quickly spirals out of control, and Hee-Soo regrets her actions. She is killed by thugs while acting as a decoy for Lena to escape.

Chief Noh is Lena's father's assistant. He is the one who tells Hyun-Min that Lena was in trouble after Hyun-Min's mother finds out about his and Lena's relationship. He often shows concern for Lena's relationship with her father.

Seung-Wook Park is one of the members of the kumdo team. He is egotistical and relies on his father's power and influence to get him a position in the kumdo nationals, rather than Lena. He frequently starts fights with the other team members, and constantly challenges Lena's leadership due to the fact that she's a girl. She finally confronts him and wins against him in a sword fight, after which she kicks him off the team.

Minor Characters
Edith is a shy, kind woman from Billa who fell in love with Ley. She was captured and taken to Glasgow where she was tortured for information about the 'Child of the Prophecy'. Ley came to save her, but she was killed by Chris before they could escape.

Maria is Gideon's foster daughter. Gideon found her in a village full of corpses when she was a baby. She has a mysterious healing power, and used it to save Lena when she first arrived in Scotland. Maria has a pet squirrel named Yoshi who is often a source of jealousy for Gideon.

Anna is a woman from Billa who loves Gideon, and often helps him take care of Maria. After Billa was destroyed by Yuriel, she left with Gideon and Maria, and they went to Lucia Island. When Gideon and Maria left the island to find Ley, she stayed.

Ruan is Cid's father, and one of the twelve knights of Kabul who swore to protect the Child of the Prophecy. He was fatally wounded by members of the Jager Tribe, and instructed Cid to find and protect the Child in his place.

Dein is one of Lucien's servants, and stays at Ashton castle to protect it in Lucien's absence.

Adam Wilson is a very mysterious servant to the Earl who was responsible for planning the attack on Leven, Campbell, and Dumlon. He is impressively well-informed concerning current and past events. His entire face has never been fully shown, making him more mysterious. Ley, Cid, and Sean once stayed with a woman named Margaret who claimed Ley reminded her of her husband who she had not seen in some time. She asked Ley to tell Adam Wilson that "Margaret was waiting for him", however Ley and Adam have not met. When the Earl is killed, Adam tells Camiel that he was only using the Earl's power, and was not truly loyal to him. He then prepares to return to Margaret.

Jira is a mysterious woman said to have come from a distant land with Lena, and became the king of Aran's concubine. Lena was stolen from her as a baby when Ariana visited Aran, and she died shortly after from the loss. She was loved by many of Aran's citizens, and supposedly looked very similar to Ley.

Visal is Prince Siegfried's servant. He often allows Siegfried to do as he pleases, even if it puts him in danger. Under Lucien's request and with Siegfried's help, he rescued Michael from Eleanor before he could be tortured to death for his betrayal.

Sir Wolf is one of the twelve knights sworn to protect the Child of the Prophecy. When the other knights were hunted down and murdered under Eleanor's orders, he went into hiding. When Lucien and Eleanor's wedding was nearing, he helped Cid, Sean, and Nox infiltrate Sevia castle to stop the gladiator match. He is later approached by Michael to join forces with Lucien.

Brenna is Sharis' older sister, and the wife of Earl Auye. She was forced into the marriage, and was unhappy to the point of attempting suicide on more than one occasion. She gave birth to a son, and was rescued by Ley, Sharis, and Linua soon after.

External links
Tokypop: Saver

Volume list

Fantasy comics
Daewon C.I. titles
2002 comics debuts
Manhwa titles